Minnesota State Highway 72 (MN 72) is a  highway in northwest Minnesota, which runs from its         
intersection with U.S. 71 in Blackduck and continues north to its northern terminus at the Canada–US border in Baudette. The road continues as Ontario Highway 11 upon entering the town of Rainy River, Ontario at the Baudette-Rainy River International Bridge.

Route description
State Highway 72 serves as a north–south route between the communities of Blackduck, Shooks, Kelliher, and Baudette.

The roadway passes through the Red Lake State Forest in northeast Beltrami County between Kelliher and Waskish. Big Bog State Recreation Area is located on Highway 72, immediately north of Waskish.

Highway 72 crosses the Rainy River at Baudette.

History
State Highway 72 was authorized as one of the first two Minnesota legislative routes in 1923. This portion of the route was located between Blackduck and Baudette.

The route was paved by 1942.

At one time, Highway 72 had continued farther north, extending over what is now State Highway 172 in Lake of the Woods County. The section of present day Minnesota 172 between State Highway 11 (at Baudette) and Wheeler's Point (at Lake of the Woods) was originally designated Minnesota 72 as well between 1934 and 1963.

Major intersections

References

072
Transportation in Beltrami County, Minnesota
Transportation in Lake of the Woods County, Minnesota